Foolad Zarand Iranian Futsal Club is an Iranian professional futsal club based in Zarand.

Season to season

The table below chronicles the achievements of the Club in various competitions.

Last updated: 16 March 2022

Notes:
* unofficial titles
1 worst title in history of club

Key

P   = Played
W   = Games won
D   = Games drawn
L   = Games lost

GF  = Goals for
GA  = Goals against
Pts = Points
Pos = Final position

Honours 

 Iran Futsal's 1st Division
 Runners-up (1): 2020–21

Players

Current squad

Personnel

Current technical staff

Last updated: 6 September 2022

Managers

Last updated: 29 August 2022

References 

Futsal clubs in Iran
Sport in Kerman Province